Trojanovice is a municipality and village in Nový Jičín District in the Moravian-Silesian Region of the Czech Republic. It has about 2,700 inhabitants.

Geography
Trojanovice lies in the Moravian-Silesian Beskids. It lies on the Lomná River. The highest point of the municipality is the Radhošť mountain, its peak lies at the municipal border.

History
The colonization of the area of Trojanovice by Vlachs began in the 16th century, when it belonged to Frenštát pod Radhoštěm. It was settled mostly by pastoralists. In 1748, it separated from Frenštát pod Radhoštěm as a self-governing municipality.

Between 1850 and 1900, almost 500 inhabitants of Trojanovice moved abroad, especially to Texas; their descendants live in Fayetteville, Weimar, Hostyn, Dubina or nearby.

Sport

The Pustevny Ski Resort is located in the southern part of the municipality. The cable car that leads to the Pustevny mountain saddle was built in 1940 and was the first of its kind in the world.

Sights
On the Radhošť mountain there are located the Chapel of Saints Cyril and Methodius, and the Radegast statue by Albin Polasek (the original from 1929 was replaced with a copy in 1998).

The Velký Javorník mountain is one of the most visited tourist destination in the Moravian-Silesian Beskids. There is a -high wooden observation tower, a restaurant built in 1935, and a paragliding ramp.

References

External links

Villages in Nový Jičín District